Oviparous animals are animals that  lay their eggs, with little or no other embryonic development within the mother. This is the reproductive method of most fish, amphibians, most reptiles, and all pterosaurs, dinosaurs (including birds), and monotremes.

In traditional usage, most insects (one being Culex pipiens, or the common house mosquito), molluscs, and arachnids are also described as oviparous.

Modes of reproduction

The traditional modes of reproduction include oviparity, taken to be the ancestral condition, traditionally where either unfertilised oocytes or fertilised eggs are spawned, and viviparity traditionally including any mechanism where young are born live, or where the development of the young is supported by either parent in or on any part of their body.

However, the biologist Thierry Lodé recently divided the traditional category of oviparous reproduction into two modes that he named ovuliparity and (true) oviparity respectively. He distinguished the two on the basis of the relationship between the zygote (fertilised egg) and the parents :
 Ovuliparity, in which fertilisation is external, is taken to be the ancestral condition as a rule; the eggs that the female releases into the environment contain unfertilised oocytes, and the male fertilises them outside her body. In whichever form they are laid, the eggs of most ovuliparous species contain a substantial quantity of yolk to support the growth and activity of the embryo after fertilisation, and sometimes for some time after hatching as well. Among the Vertebrata ovuliparity is common among fishes and most Amphibia. It occurs among Cnidaria, Ctenophora, Echinodermata, Mollusca, and several other phyla as well.
 (True) oviparity, in which fertilisation is internal. This is taken to be the derived condition, whether the male inserts the sperm into the female intromittently or whether she actively or passively picks it up—the female lays eggs containing zygotes with a substantial quantity of yolk to feed the embryo while it remains in the egg, and in many species to feed it for some time afterwards. The egg is not retained in the body for most of the period of development of the embryo within the egg, which is the main distinction between oviparity and ovoviviparity. Oviparity occurs in all birds, most reptiles, some fishes, and most Arthropoda. Among mammals, the monotremes (four species of echidna, and the platypus) are oviparous.

In all but special cases of both ovuliparity and oviparity the overwhelming source of nourishment for the embryo is the yolk material deposited in the egg by the reproductive system of the mother (the vitellogenesis); offspring that depend on yolk in this manner are said to be lecithotrophic, which literally means "feeding on yolk" (opposed to matrotrophic).

Distinguishing between the definitions of oviparity and ovuliparity necessarily reduces the number of species whose modes of reproduction are classified as oviparous, as they no longer include the ovuliparous species such as most fish, most frogs and many invertebrates. Such classifications are largely for convenience and as such can be important in practice, but speaking loosely in contexts in which the distinction is not relevant, it is common to lump both categories together as "oviparous".

References

External links
 

Animal reproductive system
Oology